Rosslyn Park Football Club is a rugby union club based in south west London.

History
Founded in 1879 by cricketing friends in north London, at the end of their first season, Charles Hoyer Millar proposed forming a football club to keep the players together during the winter. There was already a Hampstead Football Club (from which both Wasps and Harlequins sprang), so the cricket club's name was adopted,  reflecting the area of Hampstead where the cricketers first played their scratch games in the grounds of Rosslyn House. Their original rugby ground was at South End Green, Hampstead, then Gospel Oak and Acton before a lengthy tenure at Old Deer Park, Richmond until 1956, when Rosslyn Park moved to its current premises in Roehampton. After an initial blue shirt with white Maltese cross, its current red-and-white hoops were adopted in 1881. It still remains a Football Club, without the need for the word Rugby, and so is correctly Rosslyn Park FC, not RFC.

Early fixtures were generally against second XVs of leading clubs, but in the 1890s Rosslyn Park joined the first rank with fixtures against Oxford University, London Scottish, Richmond and Harlequins. Park's acceptance into the elite was signalled when venerable Blackheath agreed to play home and away fixtures in 1909. The club became the first English side to play rugby internationally when it beat Stade Français in Paris on 18 April 1892. In 1912, the club played exhibition matches in Prague, Budapest and Vienna - the first rugby matches ever played in those cities - and in 1913 played two games in Hanover, Germany. In 1939, Rosslyn Park inaugurated the annual Rosslyn Park Schools Seven Tournament, which expanded from sixteen schools to 350 in 1996. With some 7,000 players annually, it is the world's largest rugby tournament.
After the Second World war, Park again led the way with a first international fixture in 1945 against traditional rivals Stade Français. In 1951, Park was the first to bring the Ladies' Cup from the Melrose Sevens south of the border. In 1975 and 1976, the club played in the final of the John Player Cup, narrowly losing on both occasions

The club runs five senior men's sides (the 1st XV, "B's", "Hatters", "Fours", and "Nomads") and a ladies side (the "Slingbacks") who play on Sundays. Rosslyn Park also have one of the country's largest mini- and youth-rugby set-ups with sides at all age groups from under-6s up. When English league rugby began in 1987, Park were placed in Division two, which they won. The first team currently play in the third division of the English league system, National League One.

The club plays at Priory Lane, Roehampton in South-West London on a ground leased from the next-door Roehampton Club. There is one 4G (4th generation synthetic turf) pitch at the main site; additional games are played on grass pitches in nearby Richmond Park. Changing facilities for both sets of pitches are at the main site in Priory Lane. The clubhouse has two bars, which are named after two of the club's famous players – Andy Ripley and Alexander Obolensky. The first floodlights for the main pitch were famously provided by the hell-raising actor Oliver Reed who was also a member of the club and occasional player. Those lights have now been replaced after storm damage.

Some 350 Park members served in the Great War, of which 109 died, believed to be the highest number from any club. The story was told in a 2012 book The Final Whistle: the Great War in Fifteen players. The original memorial was lost but was replaced with a new board in 2014 when a Centenary memorial match was played under the Laws prevailing in 1914 and the memorial was unveiled by Bill Beaumont, Chairman of the RFU.

Current standings

Honours
 Middlesex Sevens winners: 1947, 1950, 1954, 1981
 Melrose Sevens winners: 1951
 John Player Cup finalists: 1974–75, 1975–76
 Middlesex Senior Cup winners: 1985
 Courage League National Division Two champions: 1987–88
 National Division Three South champions: 2002–03
 Surrey Cup winners: 2005
 National League 2 (north v south) promotion play-off winner: 2009–10

Notable former players
  Paul Ackford – former English international lock
  Wilf Auty – Yorkshire rugby league footballer
  Danny Cipriani – English international fly half
  Nick Easter – English international number 8
  Neil Edwards - former Scotland international lock
  Nev Edwards - Sale Sharks wing
  Hugo Ellis - England Under-20s
  Mike Friday – former England Sevens footballer
  Todd Gleave - hooker
  Phil Keith-Roach – former English international and England Scrum coach 2003 World Cup
  Alex King – former English international fly half
  Joe Launchbury – English international lock
  Bob Mordell – English international flanker, and rugby league footballer
  Alexander Obolensky – former English international wing
  Mark Odejobi – London Wasps wing
  Martin Offiah – former England and Great Britain international rugby league footballer
  John Ranson – former English international wing
  Andy Ripley – former English international number 8
  Shane Roiser – former London Wasps wing
  John Rudd – former England Saxons wing
  Adam Thompstone – London Irish wing
  Jim Unwin – former English and British & Irish Lions wing 
  Nick Walshe – former England scrumhalf
  Lionel Edward Weston – former England scrumhalf
  Chris Winn – former English international winger
  Bruce Battishall – former Australian international flanker

List of seasons (since the beginning of professional era)

Number of seasons at each level

References

External links
 Official website

English rugby union teams
Premiership Rugby teams
Richmond Park
Rugby clubs established in 1879
Rugby union clubs in London
Sport in the London Borough of Wandsworth